Dinkan (Malayalam: ഡിങ്കൻ)  is a fictional anthropomorphic superhero mouse who appears in an eponymous Malayalam comic story series in children's magazine Balamangalam. Some modern day rationalists of Kerala use Dinkan to mock organized religion and religious intolerance.

History
Dinkan (ഡിങ്കൻ) was created by story-writer N. Somasekharan and artist Baby in 1983. Dinkan was one of the earliest superhero characters created in India and it quickly became popular among children. Like Terrytoons created Mighty Mouse and several other superhero characters, Dinkan borrowed a few traits from the iconic DC Comics character Superman. He also had characteristics of Iron Man.

Character biography
Dinkan was born in Pankila forest, somewhere in Kerala, India. He was a naughty mouse, who wasn't disciplined. During one of his escapades, Dinkan was abducted by aliens from an unknown planet. They conducted experiments on him which ended up giving him superior strength, enhanced senses and the ability to fly. Somehow Dinkan found himself back in the Pankila forest and he decided to use his powers for the well-being of animals in the forest.

Dinkoism

Dinkoism has emerged as a parody religion on social networks organized by some atheists in Kerala, India. This religion celebrates Dinkan as their God in an attempt to bring awareness of the fallacies and practices of traditional religions.

British Broadcasting Corporation covered the Dinkoist religion in its BBCTrending Programme. 
BBC reported Dinkoism as an atheist movement with significant growth in the social media.

Growing recognition 
On January 3, 2016, a group of dinkoists, calling themselves Mooshikasena (the Rat Army), went to protest in front of actor Dileep's Dhe Puttu restaurant to protest his film titled Professor Dinkan ("Professor Dinkan") on the grounds that it offended their religious sentiments. This was a mockery of similar protests around the world, especially in India.

Also in January 2016, a Dinkanist in California won the right to have a license plate for his car with Dinkan written on it, in recognition of his belief.

References

External links
 News on Dinkan 
 

Atheism
Comics characters introduced in 1983
Hindu new religious movements
Indian comics titles
Indian comics characters
Internet memes
Malayalam comics
Religious parodies and satires
Parody religion deities
Animal superheroes
Comics characters with superhuman strength
Fictional anthropomorphic characters
Fictional mice and rats
Parody superheroes
Male characters in animation